Massachusetts House of Representatives' 16th Worcester district in the United States is one of 160 legislative districts included in the lower house of the Massachusetts General Court. It covers part of the city of Worcester in Worcester County. Democrat Dan Donahue of Worcester has represented the district since 2013.

The current district geographic boundary overlaps with that of the Massachusetts Senate's 2nd Worcester district.

Representatives
 Otis Newton, circa 1858 
 Jonas Fay, circa 1859 
 Joseph P. Cheney Jr., circa 1888 
 James Joseph Early, circa 1920 
 Stanley Everett Johnson, circa 1951 
 Raymond Michael Lafontaine, circa 1975 
 William Glodis
 Guy Glodis
 John Fresolo
 Daniel M. Donahue, 2013-current

Former locales
The district previously covered:
 Douglas, circa 1872 
 Dudley, circa 1872 
 Millbury, circa 1872 
 Oxford, circa 1872 
 Sutton, circa 1872 
 Webster, circa 1872

See also
 List of Massachusetts House of Representatives elections
 Other Worcester County districts of the Massachusetts House of Representatives: 1st, 2nd, 3rd, 4th, 5th, 6th, 7th, 8th, 9th, 10th, 11th, 12th, 13th, 14th, 15th, 17th, 18th
 Worcester County districts of the Massachusett Senate: 1st, 2nd; Hampshire, Franklin and Worcester; Middlesex and Worcester; Worcester, Hampden, Hampshire and Middlesex; Worcester and Middlesex; Worcester and Norfolk
 List of Massachusetts General Courts
 List of former districts of the Massachusetts House of Representatives

Images
Portraits of legislators

References

External links
 Ballotpedia
  (State House district information based on U.S. Census Bureau's American Community Survey).
 League of Women Voters of the Worcester Area

House
Government in Worcester County, Massachusetts